Honey I'm Home is the fourth studio album by Al B. Sure!, released on June 23, 2009 by Hidden Beach Recordings. It's his first release of new material since 1992's Sexy Versus.

Track listing
 "Nite & Day (Interlude)" (Al B. Sure!, Kyle West) – 0:11
 "I Love It! (Papi Aye, Aye, Aye)" (Al B. Sure!, Kyle West) – 4:44
 "I'm Glad" (Andreao Heard, Sherrod Barnes) – 4:33
 "Top of Your Lungs!" – 3:57
 "All I Wanna Do (...Is Make It Hot for You)" (Al B. Sure!, VI, Kevin Deane) – 4:13
 "Lady in My Life" (Rod Temperton) – 5:10
 "Dedicate My All" (Al B. Sure!, Kyle West) – 4:39
 "By the Way, By the Way" (Al B. Sure!, Kyle West) – 4:09
 "Only You!" (Ernie Isley, Marvin Isley, Ronald Isley, Rudolph Isley, Maurice Pearl, Al B. Sure!) – 3:30 
 "Whatcha Got?" (Al B. Sure!, Terence Dudley) – 4:12
 "Fragile" (Sting) – 3:26
 "4 Life!" (Stevie Wonder, Al B. Sure!, Kyle West) – 4:42
 "Never Stop Loving You" (Al B. Sure!, Mike Mani) – 4:14

References

Al B. Sure! albums
2009 albums
Hidden Beach Recordings albums
Universal Music Group albums